Arthur Gonzalez Solinap (born January 19, 1980) is a Filipino actor and model. He is known for his role as Robert in Pepito Manaloto. Solinap's career began as a member of Abztract Dancers together with his cousin Dingdong Dantes. He made his first TV appearance in 2005 as Muros in Encantadia and later played Diego in the 2007 series of MariMar.

Personal life
Solinap is married to actress Rochelle Pangilinan. The couple has a child.

Filmography

Television

Film

Reference

External links

1980 births
Living people
GMA Network personalities
Survivor Philippines contestants
Male actors from Manila
Filipino people of Spanish descent
People from Iloilo
Visayan people
Hiligaynon people
Tagalog people